Our Lady of Manaoag (formal title: Our Lady of the Most Holy Rosary of Manaoag; Spanish: Nuestra Señora del Santísimo Rosario de Manaoag) is a Roman Catholic title of the Blessed Virgin Mary venerated in Manaoag, Pangasinan, the Philippines.

The ivory and silver image which bears its title dates from the 16th century and is presently enshrined within the Minor Basilica of Our Lady of the Most Holy Rosary of Manaoag. The shrine is a major pilgrimage site in the country and is administered by the Order of Preachers within the Archdiocese of Lingayen-Dagupan.

Pope Pius XI granted a canonical coronation to the image on 25 August 1925. The coronation took place on 21 April 1926, while Pope Benedict XVI raised her sanctuary in equal indulgences to the Basilica of Saint Mary Major on 21 June 2011. Under this Marian title, the Blessed Virgin Mary is invoked as patroness of the sick, helpless and needy. The image is celebrated twice a year: the third Wednesday after Easter and first Sunday of October.

Etymology
Tradition holds the town of Manaoag was derived from the Pangasinense verb mantaoag, which means "to call" (from the root taoag, "call").

Statue 

The statue of Our Lady of Manaoag is a 17th-century ivory and silver image of the Virgin Mary with The Child Jesus enshrined at the high altar of the Basilica. It was brought to the Philippines from Spain via the Manila galleon trade from Acapulco, Mexico, in the early 17th century by Padre Juan de San Jacinto.

Documents dating back to 1610 attest that a middle-aged farmer walking home heard a mysterious female voice. He looked around and saw on a cloud-veiled treetop an apparition of the Virgin Mary, holding a Rosary in her right hand and The Child Jesus in her left arm, all amidst a heavenly glow. Mary told the farmer where she wanted her church to be built, and a chapel was built on the hilltop site of the apparition, forming the nucleus of the present town.

Our Lady of the Rosary is depicted in other countries with similar attributes, with the accoutrement and style of the vestments varying across cultures. The Manaoag image is distinct from other statues in its sculpture and regalia, particularly its crown.

A pilgrim replica of the image also exists and is toured around parishes in the Philippines for veneration.

Regalia and security 
The image of Our Lady of Manaoag and her bejeweled crown are considered priceless. There have been several attempts to burglarize the Manaoag Shrine of the jewels sewn into the icon's dress and set into its regalia which include crowns, halos, rosary,  scepters, and marshal's baton.

Several of her golden crowns and halos are deposited at the shrine's museum, donated by both local and foreign devotees. An expensive collection of liturgical vestments that have been used by the image and the Dominican priests are also on display, as are an array of perfumes used to anoint the image. These are ex-votos given by devotees and pilgrims from around the world.

The image of Our Lady of Manaoag is fully secured within a bulletproof glass enclosure above the new high Altar, which has additional wood carvings, an elevated pedestal, and four golden candelabras. The coat-of-arms of the Dominicans is embedded above the image's window as a demonstration of the Order's devotion to her. The bas-relief, made of narra carvings beneath her throne that beautifully depicts the historic events in the devotion to Our Lady, has been refurbished.

The archdiocese, in line with the Filipino custom of venerating an image by touching its body or clothing, constructed a staircase that rises to the Veneration Room on the second floor behind the apse. The room has pews in front of the alcove behind the image's shrine. Supplicants kneel before the glass  small window behind the image's base to pray and touch the hem of the image's mantle, often dropping written prayers into a nearby box. After venerating the image, devotees pass through the religious goods shop on their way out.

Veneration

Miracles 

Some of the earliest miracles attributed to Our Lady of Manaoag, including the original apparition, are depicted in the murals in the church.

In the early days of the Spanish era, animist mountain tribes burnt down newly-Christianized villages. The town of Manaoag was among the settlements that were burnt by the raiders, sending the locals fleeing to the thatch-roofed church. The pillagers's leader climbed over the church compound's crude fence and shot flaming arrows at all parts of the church, but the building miraculously did not catch fire.

During the Second World War, enemy Japanese forces dropped several bombs within the church's vicinity. The structure was only moderately damaged. Four bombs were released above the church, with three landing on the plaza and the facade, destroying both. The last bomb fell into the sanctuary, but miraculously did not explode. The supposed presence of chrysanthemum flowers in the church prevented the Japanese soldiers from doing acts of desecration, due to the flower being revered in their culture.

Other miracles recounted and attributed to the Lady of Manaoag includes rainfalls during droughts, reviving an already-dead boy through holy intercession and holy water, stopping a fire that originated from the church, and resisting various attempts at relocating the shrine.

Miracles attributed to the Lady of Manaoag in modern times are widespread, attested by believers and widely promoted by word of mouth, publications and legends. As such, pilgrims often invoke Her intercession in times of dire need, with some of the petitioners travelling all the way from far places to do so.

Feasts 
The primary feast of Our Lady of Manaoag is on the third Wednesday of Easter. The peaks of the pilgrimages are during the Lenten and Easter seasons, the month of May, and the month of October - the month of The Holy Rosary - where the universal feast day of Our Lady of The Holy Rosary is celebrated every first Sunday of October. There is a procession after the afternoon Mass on these occasions.

Services 
Thousands converge on Saturdays and Sundays to pray for their intentions, hear Mass, pray the Rosary, offer flowers, light candles, buy religious articles, have religious articles or vehicles blessed, get holy water, and join in the daily and seasonal activities. The blessings of religious articles and vehicles are performed at the back of the church grounds after every Mass, while holy water is also dispensed there for free to those with containers.

The short dawn procession and Scriptural Rosary every first Saturday before the 5 a.m. Mass is well-attended by regular pilgrims mostly from Metro Manila and from Regions I (Ilocos), II (Cagayan Valley), and III (Central Luzon). These first Saturday rites are pursuant to the Communion of Reparation on the First Saturdays requested by the Virgin Mary in her third apparition at Fátima on 13 July 1917 for the preservation of world peace.

Any of the Masses in the regular schedule may be offered for personal petitions and thanksgiving. The 7 a.m. Masses on Fridays (except on Good Friday) may be offered for the soul in Purgatory of a dearly departed. These may be done through the parish office at the right side of the main entrance of the church; at the Shrine Museum; or at the back of the church beside the religious store at the entrance of the Candle Gallery. Mass offerings and donations may be offered also through its website.

Services at the shrine and religious programming are broadcast on Radyo Manaoag 102.7 FM, which is also accessible through the shrine's official website.

In Guam 
A three-foot replica of the image of Our Lady of Manaoag was donated by a devotee and traveled to the United States unincorporated territory of Guam on 17 August 2012. The statue was enshrined at the Saint Anthony of Padua and Saint Victor Catholic Church in Tamuning, Guam where a dedication rite was held the following day, attended by Filipino-Guamanian Catholics. The statue traveled as a paid passenger aboard a United Airlines flight.

See also
Roman Catholicism in the Philippines
Marian apparition
Our Lady of La Naval, a similar Marian image enshrined in Quezon City

References

External links
Shrine of Our Lady of Manaoag Official Website

Manaoag
Catholic Church in the Philippines
Religion in Pangasinan
Titles of Mary